Paul Khoury is a Lebanese-Australian television personality and voice talent.

Khoury was bass guitarist in a Melbourne band called Gravel, before entering and winning the Cleo Bachelor of the Year award in 2002. He has had roles on Australian TV shows such as Blue Heelers.

In 2009, Khoury provided commentary for Fox8's Crown Australian Celebrity Poker Challenge, hosted Miss World Australia for the Seven Network, and was the announcer for Bert's Family Feud on the Nine Network. Khoury left the show to take up an international project for cable television. He hosted a series shown around the world - "Coffee Lovers’ Guide to Italy" - which has been played in Australia on Foxtel's Lifestyle Channel, AFC (Asian Food Channel) and many countries around the world. Foxtel. His voice was his ticket to working with television legend Bert Newton as his voice-over and sidekick on Nine's Family Feud. Khoury is the lead anchor for the Asia Pacific Poker Tour series shown on ESPN and has also become the leading commentator in the international Poker arena working with 441 productions in New York City. From 2010 to 2015 he hosted one of the richest poker events in the world, The Aussie Millions- Aired on GSN in the United States -Prime Time - ESPN and One-HD

References

External links
Paul Khoury MySpace Page

Australian male voice actors
Australian bass guitarists
Poker commentators
Living people
Place of birth missing (living people)
Television personalities from Melbourne
Year of birth missing (living people)